Vladimir Dmitrievich Chernyshov (21 June 1951 – 1 May 2004) was a Russian former volleyball player who competed for the Soviet Union in the 1976 Summer Olympics and in the 1980 Summer Olympics.

He was born in Pochinok, Smolensk Oblast and died in Licciana Nardi, Italy.

In 1976 he was part of the Soviet team which won the silver medal in the Olympic tournament. He played all five matches.

Four years later he won the gold medal with the Soviet team in the 1980 Olympic tournament. He played five matches.

External links
 profile

1951 births
2004 deaths
People from Pochinok
Russian men's volleyball players
Soviet men's volleyball players
Olympic volleyball players of the Soviet Union
Volleyball players at the 1976 Summer Olympics
Volleyball players at the 1980 Summer Olympics
Olympic gold medalists for the Soviet Union
Olympic silver medalists for the Soviet Union
Olympic medalists in volleyball
Medalists at the 1980 Summer Olympics
Medalists at the 1976 Summer Olympics
Sportspeople from Smolensk Oblast
Licciana Nardi